Psacadonotus is a genus of insect in family Tettigoniidae.

Species 

The following species are recognised in the genus Psacadonotus:

 Psacadonotus diurnus Rentz, 1993
 Psacadonotus insulanus Rentz, 1993
 Psacadonotus kenkulun Rentz, 1993
 Psacadonotus psithyros Rentz, 1993
 Psacadonotus robustus Rentz, 1993
 Psacadonotus seriatus Redtenbacher, 1891
 Psacadonotus serratimerus Rentz, 1993
 Psacadonotus viridis Rentz, 1993

References 

Tettigoniidae genera
Taxonomy articles created by Polbot